Rissoina bouvieri is a species of minute sea snail, a marine gastropod mollusk or micromollusk in the family Rissoinidae.

Description

Distribution
This species occurs in the Red Sea.

References

 Jousseaume F.P. 1894. Diagnose des coquilles de nouveaux mollusques. Bulletin de la Société Philomathique de Paris, série 8, 6: 98-105
 Vine, P. (1986). Red Sea Invertebrates. Immel Publishing, London. 224 pp.

External links

Rissoinidae
Gastropods described in 1894